Negligence (Lat. negligentia) is a failure to exercise appropriate and/or ethical ruled care expected to be exercised amongst specified circumstances. The area of tort law known as negligence involves harm caused by failing to act as a form of carelessness possibly with extenuating circumstances. The core concept of negligence is that people should exercise reasonable care in their actions, by taking account of the potential harm that they might foreseeably cause to other people or property.

Someone who suffers loss caused by another's negligence may be able to sue for damages to compensate for their harm. Such loss may include physical injury, harm to property, psychiatric illness, or economic loss. The law on negligence may be assessed in general terms according to a five-part model which includes the assessment of duty, breach, actual cause, proximate cause, and damages.

Elements of negligence claims
Some things must be established by anyone who wants to sue in negligence. These are what are called the "elements" of negligence.

Most jurisdictions say that there are four elements to a negligence action:
duty: the defendant has a duty to others, including the plaintiff, to exercise reasonable care,
breach: the defendant breaches that duty through an act or culpable omission,
damages: as a result of that act or omission, the plaintiff suffers an injury, and
causation: the injury to the plaintiff is a reasonably foreseeable consequence of the defendant's act or omission.

Some jurisdictions narrow the definition down to three elements: duty, breach and proximately caused harm. Some jurisdictions recognize five elements, duty, breach, actual cause, proximate cause, and damages. However, at their heart, the various definitions of what constitutes negligent conduct are very similar.

Duty of care

The legal liability of a defendant to a plaintiff is based on the defendant's failure to fulfil a responsibility, recognised by law, of which the plaintiff is the intended beneficiary. The first step in determining the existence of a legally recognised responsibility is the concept of an obligation or duty. In the tort of negligence the term used is duty of care 

The case of Donoghue v Stevenson [1932] established the modern law of negligence, laying the foundations of the duty of care and the fault principle which, (through the Privy Council), have been adopted throughout the Commonwealth. May Donoghue and her friend were in a café in Paisley. The friend bought Mrs Donoghue a ginger beer float.  She drank some of the beer and later poured the remainder over her ice-cream and was horrified to see the decomposed remains of a snail exit the bottle. Donoghue suffered nervous shock and gastro-enteritis, but did not sue the cafe owner, instead suing the manufacturer, Stevenson. (As Mrs Donoghue had not herself bought the ginger beer, the doctrine of privity precluded a contractual action against Stevenson).

The Scottish judge, Lord MacMillan, considered the case to fall within a new category of delict (the Scots law nearest equivalent of tort). The case proceeded to the House of Lords, where Lord Atkin interpreted the biblical ordinance to 'love thy neighbour' as a legal requirement to 'not harm thy neighbour.' He then went on to define neighbour as "persons who are so closely and directly affected by my act that I ought reasonably to have them in contemplation as being so affected when I am directing my mind to the acts or omissions that are called in question."

In England the more recent case of Caparo Industries Plc v Dickman [1990] introduced a 'threefold test' for a duty of care. Harm must be (1) reasonably foreseeable (2) there must be a relationship of proximity between the plaintiff and defendant and (3) it must be 'fair, just and reasonable' to impose liability. However, these act as guidelines for the courts in establishing a duty of care; much of the principle is still at the discretion of judges.

In Australia, Donoghue v Stevenson was used as a persuasive precedent in the case of Grant v Australian Knitting Mills (AKR) (1936). This was a landmark case in the development of negligence law in Australia.

Whether a duty of care is owed for psychiatric, as opposed to physical, harm was discussed in the Australian case of Tame v State of New South Wales; Annetts v Australian Stations Pty Ltd (2002). Determining a duty for mental harm has now been subsumed into the Civil Liability Act 2002 in New South Wales. The application of Part 3 of the Civil Liability Act 2002 (NSW) was demonstrated in Wicks v SRA (NSW); Sheehan v SRA (NSW).

Breach of duty

Once it is established that the defendant owed a duty to the plaintiff/claimant, the matter of whether or not that duty was breached must be settled.  The test is both subjective and objective.  The defendant who knowingly (subjective, which is totally based on observation and personal prejudice or view) exposes the plaintiff/claimant to a substantial risk of loss, breaches that duty.  The defendant who fails to realize the substantial risk of loss to the plaintiff/claimant, which any reasonable person [objective, Which is totally based on ground facts and reality without any personal prejudice or point of view.] in the same situation would clearly have realized, also breaches that duty. However, whether the test is objective or subjective may depend upon the particular case involved.

There is a reduced threshold for the standard of care owed by children. In the Australian case of McHale v Watson, McHale, a 9-year-old girl was blinded in one eye after being hit by the ricochet of a sharp metal rod thrown by a 12-year-old boy, Watson. The defendant child was held not to have the level of care to the standard of an adult, but of a 12-year-old child with similar experience and intelligence. Kitto J explained that a child's lack of foresight is a characteristic they share with others at that stage of development. The same principle was demonstrated to exist in English law in Mullin v Richards.

Certain jurisdictions, also provide for breaches where professionals, such as doctors, fail to warn of risks associated with medical treatments or procedures. Doctors owe both objective and subjective duties to warn; and breach of either is sufficient to satisfy this element in a court of law. For example, the Civil Liability Act in Queensland outlines a statutory test incorporating both objective and subjective elements. For example, an obstetrician who fails to warn a mother of complications arising from childbirth may be held to have breached their professional duty of care.

In Donoghue v Stevenson, Lord Macmillan declared that "the categories of negligence are never closed"; and in Dorset Yacht v Home Office it was held that the government had no immunity from suit when they negligently failed to prevent the escape of juvenile offenders who subsequently vandalise a boatyard.  In other words, all members of society have a duty to exercise reasonable care toward others and their property.  In Bolton v. Stone (1951),  the House of Lords held that a defendant was not negligent if the damage to the plaintiff were not a reasonably foreseeable consequence of his conduct. In the case, a Miss Stone was struck on the head by a cricket ball while standing outside a cricket ground. Finding that no batsman would normally be able hit a cricket ball far enough to reach a person standing as far away as was Miss Stone, the court held her claim would fail because the danger was not reasonably or sufficiently foreseeable. As stated in the opinion, 'reasonable risk' cannot be judged with the benefit of hindsight.  In Roe v Minister of Health, Lord Denning said the past should not be viewed through rose coloured spectacles, finding no negligence on the part of medical professionals accused of using contaminated medical jars, since contemporary standards would have indicated only a low possibility of medical jar contamination.

United States v. Carroll Towing Co. 159 F.2d 169 (2d. Cir. 1947)
For the rule in the U.S., see: Calculus of negligence

Intention and/or malice
Further establishment of conditions of intention or malice where applicable may apply in cases of gross negligence.

Causation

In order for liability to result from a negligent act or omission, it is necessary to prove not only that the injury was caused by that negligence, but also that there is a legally sufficient connection between the act and the negligence.

Factual causation (actual cause)

For a defendant to be held liable, it must be shown that the particular acts or omissions were the cause of the loss or damage sustained. Although the notion sounds simple, the causation between one's breach of duty and the harm that results to another can at times be very complicated. The basic test is to ask whether the injury would have occurred 'but for', or without, the accused party's breach of the duty owed to the injured party. In Australia, the High Court has held that the 'but for' test is not the exclusive test of causation because it cannot address a situation where there is more than one cause of damage. When 'but for' test is not satisfied and the case is an exceptional one, a commonsense test ('Whether and Why' test) will be applied
Even more precisely, if a breaching party materially increases the risk of harm to another, then the breaching party can be sued to the value of harm that he caused.

Asbestos litigations which have been ongoing for decades revolve around the issue of causation. Interwoven with the simple idea of a party causing harm to another are issues on insurance bills and compensations, which sometimes drove compensating companies out of business.

Legal causation (proximate cause) 

Sometimes factual causation is distinguished from 'legal causation' to avert the danger of defendants being exposed to, in the words of Cardozo, J., "liability in an indeterminate amount for an indeterminate time to an indeterminate class." It is said a new question arises of how remote a consequence a person's harm is from another's negligence. We say that one's negligence is 'too remote' (in England) or not a 'proximate cause' (in the U.S.) of another's harm if one would 'never' reasonably foresee it happening. Note that a 'proximate cause' in U.S. terminology (to do with the chain of events between the action and the injury) should not be confused with the 'proximity test' under the English duty of care (to do with closeness of relationship). The idea of legal causation is that if no one can foresee something bad happening, and therefore take care to avoid it, how could anyone be responsible? For instance, in Palsgraf v. Long Island Rail Road Co. the judge decided that the defendant, a railway, was not liable for an injury suffered by a distant bystander.  The plaintiff, Palsgraf, was hit by coin-operated scale which toppled because of fireworks explosion that fell on her as she waited on a train platform. The scales fell because of a far-away commotion but it was not clear that what type of commotion caused the scale to fall, either it was the explosion's effect or the confused movement of the terrified people. A train conductor had run to help a man into a departing train. The man was carrying a package as he jogged to jump in the train door. The package had fireworks in it. The conductor mishandled the passenger or his package, causing the package to fall. The fireworks slipped and exploded on the ground causing shockwaves to travel through the platform, which became the cause of commotion on platform, and as a consequence, the scales fell. Because Palsgraf was hurt by the falling scales, she sued the train company who employed the conductor for negligence.

The defendant train company argued it should not be liable as a matter of law, because despite the fact that they employed the employee, who was negligent, his negligence was too remote from the plaintiff's injury. On appeal, the majority of the court agreed, with four judges adopting the reasons, written by Judge Cardozo, that the defendant owed no duty of care to the plaintiff, because a duty was owed only to foreseeable plaintiffs. Three judges dissented, arguing, as written by Judge Andrews, that the defendant owed a duty to the plaintiff, regardless of foreseeability, because all men owe one another a duty not to act negligently.

Such disparity of views on the element of remoteness continues to trouble the judiciary. Courts that follow Cardozo's view have greater control in negligence cases. If the court can find that, as a matter of law, the defendant owed no duty of care to the plaintiff, the plaintiff will lose his case for negligence before having a chance to present to the jury. Cardozo's view is the majority view. However, some courts follow the position put forth by Judge Andrews. In jurisdictions following the minority rule, defendants must phrase their remoteness arguments in terms of proximate cause if they wish the court to take the case away from the jury.

Remoteness takes another form, seen in The Wagon Mound (No. 2). The Wagon Mound was a ship in Sydney harbour. The ship leaked oil creating a slick in part of the harbour.  The wharf owner asked the ship owner about the danger and was told he could continue his work because the slick would not burn.  The wharf owner allowed work to continue on the wharf, which sent sparks onto a rag in the water which ignited and created a fire which burnt down the wharf. The Privy Council determined that the wharf owner 'intervened' in the causal chain, creating a responsibility for the fire which canceled out the liability of the ship owner.

In Australia the concept of remoteness, or proximity, was tested with the case of Jaensch v Coffey. The wife of a policeman, Mrs Coffey suffered a nervous shock injury from the aftermath of a motor vehicle collision although she was not actually at the scene at the time of the collision. The court upheld that, in addition to it being reasonably foreseeable that his wife might suffer such an injury, it required that there be sufficient proximity between the plaintiff and the defendant who caused the collision. Here there was sufficient causal proximity. See also Kavanagh v Akhtar, Imbree v McNeilly, and Tame v NSW.

Injury
Even though there is breach of duty, and the cause of some injury to the defendant, a plaintiff may not recover unless he can prove that the defendant's breach caused a pecuniary injury. This should not be mistaken with the requirements that a plaintiff prove harm to recover. As a general rule, a plaintiff can only rely on a legal remedy to the point that he proves that he suffered a loss; it was reasonably foreseeable. It means something more than pecuniary loss is a necessary element of the plaintiff's case in negligence. When damages are not a necessary element, a plaintiff can win his case without showing that he suffered any loss; he would be entitled to nominal damages and any other damages according to proof. (See Constantine v Imperial Hotels Ltd [1944] KB]).

Negligence is different in that the plaintiff must prove his loss, and a particular kind of loss, to recover. In some cases, a defendant may not dispute the loss, but the requirement is significant in cases where a defendant cannot deny his negligence, but the plaintiff suffered no pecuniary loss as a result even though he had suffered emotional injury or damage but he cannot be compensated for these kind of losses. The plaintiff can be compensated for emotional or non-pecuniary losses on the condition that If the plaintiff can prove pecuniary loss, then he can also obtain damages for non-pecuniary injuries, such as emotional distress.

The requirement of pecuniary loss can be shown in a number of ways. A plaintiff who is physically injured by allegedly negligent conduct may show that he had to pay a medical bill. If his property is damaged, he could show the income lost because he could not use it, the cost to repair it, although he could only recover for one of these things.

The damage may be physical, purely economic, both physical and economic (loss of earnings following a personal injury,) or reputational (in a defamation case).

In English law, the right to claim for purely economic loss is limited to a number of 'special' and clearly defined circumstances, often related to the nature of the duty to the plaintiff as between clients and lawyers, financial advisers, and other professions where money is central to the consultative services.

Emotional distress has been recognized as an actionable tort. Generally, emotional distress damages had to be parasitic. That is, the plaintiff could recover for emotional distress caused by injury, but only if it accompanied a physical or pecuniary injury.

A claimant who has suffered only emotional distress and no pecuniary loss would not recover for negligence. However, courts have recently allowed recovery for a plaintiff to recover for purely emotional distress under certain circumstances. The state courts of California allowed recovery for emotional distress aloneeven in the absence of any physical injury, when the defendant physically injures a relative of the plaintiff, and the plaintiff witnesses it.

The eggshell skull rule is a legal doctrine upheld in some tort law systems, which holds that a tortfeasor is liable for the full extent of damage caused, even where the extent of the damage is due to the unforeseen frailty of the claimant. The eggshell skull rule was recently maintained in Australia in the case of Kavanagh v Akhtar.

Special Doctrines 
Res ipsa loquitor. This is Latin for "the thing speaks for itself." To prove negligence under this doctrine the plaintiff must prove (1) the incident does not usually happen without negligence, (2) the object that caused the harm was under the defendant's control and (3) the plaintiff did not contribute to the cause.

Negligence per se comes down to whether or not a party violated a standard in law meant to protect the public such as a building code or speed limit.

Damages

Damages place a monetary value on the harm done, following the principle of restitutio in integrum (Latin for "restoration to the original condition"). Thus, for most purposes connected with the quantification of damages, the degree of culpability in the breach of the duty of care is irrelevant. Once the breach of the duty is established, the only requirement is to compensate the victim.

One of the main tests that is posed when deliberating whether a claimant is entitled to compensation for a tort, is the "reasonable person". The test is self-explanatory: would a reasonable person (as determined by a judge or jury), under the given circumstances, have done what the defendant did to cause the injury in question; or, in other words, would a reasonable person, acting reasonably, have engaged in similar conduct when compared to the one whose actions caused the injury in question? Simple as the "reasonable person" test sounds, it is very complicated. It is a risky test because it involves the opinion of either the judge or the jury that can be based on limited facts. However, as vague as the "reasonable person" test seems, it is extremely important in deciding whether or not a plaintiff is entitled to compensation for a negligence tort.

Damages are compensatory in nature.  Compensatory damages addresses a plaintiff/claimant's losses (in cases involving physical or mental injury the amount awarded also compensates for pain and suffering). The award should make the plaintiff whole, sufficient to put the plaintiff back in the position he or she was before Defendant's negligent act.  Anything more would unlawfully permit a plaintiff to profit from the tort.

There are also two other general principles relating to damages. Firstly, the award of damages should take place in the form of a single lump sum payment. Therefore, a defendant should not be required to make periodic payments (however some statutes give exceptions for this). Secondly, the Court is not concerned with how the plaintiff uses the award of damages. For example, if a plaintiff is awarded $100,000 for physical harm, the plaintiff is not required to spend this money on medical bills to restore them to their original position – they can spend this money any way they want.

Types of damage
 Special damages – quantifiable dollar losses suffered from the date of defendant's negligent act (the tort) up to a specified time (proven at trial).  Special damage examples include lost wages, medical bills, and damage to property such as one's car.
 General damages – these are damages that are not quantified in monetary terms (e.g., there's no invoice or receipt as there would be to prove special damages).  A general damage example is an amount for the pain and suffering one experiences from a car collision. Lastly, where the plaintiff proves only minimal loss or damage, or the court or jury is unable to quantify the losses, the court or jury may award nominal damages.
 Punitive damages – Punitive damages are to punish a defendant, rather than to compensate plaintiffs, in negligence cases. In most jurisdictions punitive damages are recoverable in a negligence action, but only if the plaintiff shows that the defendant’s conduct was more than ordinary negligence (i.e., wanton and willful or reckless).
 Aggravated damages – In contrast to exemplary damages, compensation are given to the plaintiff when the harm is aggravated by the defendant's conduct. For example, the manner of this wrongful act increased the injury by subjecting the plaintiff to humiliation, insult.

Worldwide

India
With regard to negligence, Indian jurisprudence follows the approach stated in Ratanlal & Dhirajlal: The Law of Torts, laying down three elements:
A duty of care (i.e. a legal duty to exercise "ordinary care and skill")
A violation of the appropriate standard of care
 Causation (i.e. the violation resulted in injury to the plaintiff's person or property)

The Indian approach to professional negligence requires that any skilled task requires a skilled professional. Such a professional would be expected to be exercising his skill with reasonable competence. Professionals may be held liable for negligence on one of two findings:
They were not possessed of the requisite skill which he professed to have possessed.
They did not exercise, with reasonable competence in the given case, the skill which he did possess. The standard to be applied for determining whether or not either of the two findings can be made is whether a competent person exercising ordinary skill in that profession would possess or exercise in a similar manner the skill in question. Consequently, it is not necessary for every professional to possess the highest level of expertise in that branch which he practices. Professional opinion is generally accepted, but courts may rule otherwise if they feel that the opinion is "not reasonable or responsible".

United States
The United States generally recognizes four elements to a negligence action: duty, breach, proximate causation and injury. A plaintiff who makes a negligence claim must prove all four elements of negligence in order to win his or her case. Therefore, if it is highly unlikely that the plaintiff can prove one of the elements, the defendant may request judicial resolution early on, to prevent the case from going to a jury. This can be by way of a demurrer, motion to dismiss, or motion for summary judgment.

The elements allow a defendant to test a plaintiff's accusations before trial, as well as providing a guide to the finder of fact at trial (the judge in a bench trial, or jury in a jury trial) to decide whether the defendant is or is not liable. Whether the case is resolved with or without trial again depends heavily on the particular facts of the case, and the ability of the parties to frame the issues to the court. The duty and causation elements in particular give the court the greatest opportunity to take the case from the jury, because they directly involve questions of policy. The court can find that regardless of any disputed facts, the case may be resolved as a matter of law from undisputed facts because as a matter of law the defendant cannot be legally responsible for the plaintiff's injury under a theory of negligence.

On appeal, depending on the disposition of the case and the question on appeal, the court reviewing a trial court's determination that the defendant was negligent will analyze at least one of the elements of the cause of action to determine if it is properly supported by the facts and law. For example, in an appeal from a final judgment after a jury verdict, the appellate court will review the record to verify that the jury was properly instructed on each contested element, and that the record shows sufficient evidence for the jury's findings. On an appeal from a dismissal or judgment against the plaintiff without trial, the court will review de novo whether the court below properly found that the plaintiff could not prove any or all of his or her case.

See also 

 Carelessness
 Criminal negligence
 Gross negligence
 Intentionality
 Malpractice
 Medical negligence
 Mens rea
 Neglect
 Negligence in English Law

Notes

References

Citations

External links
 — Britannica 1911's account of negligence: an interesting historical read, preceding the era of Buick Motor and Donoghue v. Stevenson.

Tort law
 
Legal doctrines and principles